The third Peace of Pressburg (also known as Treaty of Pressburg) was a peace treaty concluded in Pressburg (then Pozsony today's Bratislava).  It was signed on 30 December 1626 between Gabriel Bethlen of Transylvania, the leader of an uprising against the Habsburg monarchy from 1619–1626, and Holy Roman Emperor Ferdinand II. The agreement put an end to the revolt by confirming the Peace of Nikolsburg (31 December 1621). In return, Bethlen agreed not to fight against the emperor anymore, nor would he ally with the Ottoman Turks.

References

Pressburg
History of Bratislava
1626 treaties
1626 in the Holy Roman Empire
Ferdinand II, Holy Roman Emperor